... Because I Can is the first (and only) studio album by Mice, and released through the Permanent Records label.  Although a second album, New And Improved, was released, this was not a new album but rather an extended re-issue, released through the Jamtart label.

History of Mice
Mice were formed in 1995 by (then) ex-All About Eve lead singer Julianne Regan and ex-Powder bassist Tim McTighe.  The band also featured former Levitation guitarist Christian Hayes (aka Bic), as well as (ex-All About Eve) drummer Mark Price (at that point in time, Regan's brother-in-law). As well as these permanent members, Mice also featured many collaborations, including other former members of All About Eve, Marty Willson-Piper and Andy Cousin.

Mice released their first single "Mat's Prozac" in November 1995, a second single "The Milkman" in early 1996, a third and final single "Dear Sir" in July, and this album in August of that year. The band also extensively toured the country during 1996 with Dominic Luckman on drums, Dave Woodman on guitar and Ali Kane playing keyboards.  Permanent Records went bankrupt in 1997 owing the band money, and the album (despite having made the Indie Top 10 in the UK) and its singles were left hanging in the shops without replacement or support. Mice disbanded shortly afterwards.

Versions
Two versions of this album exist - a standard one disc version and a special edition two disc version, the second disc containing four songs from a BBC Radio 1 session.

Personnel on BBC Radio 1 session:
Guitars: Dave Woodman; Julianne Regan; Marty Wilson-Piper. 
Keyboards: Ali Kane. 
Bass: Tim McTighe. 
Drums: Dominic Luckman.

At approx 2:14 on the live version of Blue Sonic Boy (song 3) Marty Wilson-Piper broke a string during the recording.

Track listing
"Mat's Prozac"
"Star"
"Dear Sir"
"Bang Bang"
"The Milkman"
"Blue Sonic Boy"
"Julie Christie"
"Miss World"
"Trumpet Song"
"Battersea"
"Messed Up"

On the special edition version, disc two contained live recordings of:

"The Milkman"
"Mat's Prozac"
"Blue Sonic Boy"
"Dear Sir"

Notes
The band were originally going to be called The Innocent, until a late change. However, by this stage Permanent Records had got slightly confused, and thought the album was being called The Innocent instead. Some promo copies of the "Mat's Prozac" single stated the forthcoming album to be The Innocent instead of ... Because I Can.

"Battersea" was a left-over demo that would have found its way onto the fifth All About Eve studio album had not the group disbanded in 1993.  However, since the 1999 reformation of All About Eve, it has never been played as an All About Eve song.

References

1996 debut albums
Mice (band) albums